In cultural studies, media culture refers to the current Western capitalist society that emerged and developed from the 20th century, under the influence of mass media. The term alludes to the overall impact and intellectual guidance exerted by the media (primarily TV, but also the press, radio and cinema), not only on public opinion but also on tastes and values.

The alternative term mass culture conveys the idea that such culture emerges spontaneously from the masses themselves, like popular art did before the 20th century. The expression media culture, on the other hand, conveys the idea that such culture is the product of the mass media. Another alternative term for media culture is "image culture."

Media culture, with its declinations of advertising and public relations, is often considered as a system centered on the manipulation of the mass of society. Corporate media "are used primarily to represent and reproduce dominant ideologies." Prominent in the development of this perspective has been the work of Theodor Adorno since the 1940s. Media culture is associated with consumerism, and in this sense called alternatively "consumer culture."

Definitions

The news media mines the work of scientists and scholars and conveys it to the general public, often emphasizing elements that have inherent appeal or the power to amaze. For instance, giant pandas (a species in remote Chinese woodlands) have become well-known items of popular culture; parasitic worms, though of greater practical importance, have not. Both scholarly facts and news stories get modified through popular transmission, often to the point of outright falsehoods.

As "Dumbing Down of Society" 
Hannah Arendt's 1961 essay "The Crisis in Culture" suggested that a media driven by markets would lead to culture being replaced by the commands of entertainment. Susan Sontag argues that in our culture, the most "...intelligible, persuasive values are [increasingly] drawn from the entertainment industries". As a result, "tepid, the glib, and the senselessly cruel" topics are becoming the norm.

Some critics argue that popular culture is "dumbing down": "newspapers that once ran foreign news now feature celebrity gossip, pictures of scantily dressed young ladies... television has replaced high-quality drama with gardening, cookery, and other "lifestyle" programmes [and] reality TV and asinine soaps," to the point that people are constantly immersed in trivia about celebrity culture.

Critics have lamented the "replacement of high art and authentic folk culture by tasteless industrialized artefacts produced on a mass scale in order to satisfy the lowest common denominator." According to them, the popular culture which rose after the end of the Second World War led to the concentration of media into a handful of large, multinational conglomerates. This popular press decreased the amount of actual news or information and replaced it with entertainment or titillation that reinforces "fears, prejudice, scapegoating processes, paranoia, and aggression."

As an unfavorable influence on television and cinema 
According to Altheide and Snow, media culture means that within a culture, the media increasingly influences other institutions (e.g. politics, religion, sports), which become constructed alongside a media logic. Since the 1950s, television has been the main medium for molding public opinion.

In Rosenberg and White's book Mass Culture, Dwight Macdonald argues that "Popular culture is a debased, trivial culture that voids both the deep realities (sex, death, failure, tragedy) and also the simple spontaneous pleasures... The masses, debauched by several generations of this sort of thing, in turn come to demand trivial and comfortable cultural products." Van den Haag argues that "all mass media in the end alienate people from personal experience and though appearing to offset it, intensify their moral isolation from each other, from the reality and from themselves."

Critics of television and film have argued that the quality of TV output has been diluted as stations pursue ratings by focusing on whatever is attractive and eye-catching, which ends up being heavily superficial. Hollywood films have changed from creating formulaic films which emphasize "shock-value and superficial thrill[s]" and the use of special effects, with themes that focus on the "basic instincts of aggression, revenge, violence, [and] greed." The plots are mostly simple, easy-to-comprehend and follow a standardized format which is similar to its predecessors. This leads to a decline in creative plotlines or elements, leaving the characters poorly-made, bland, repetitive and the dialogues unengaging, inaccurately representing the complexities of real life, or even unreal.

More recently, scholars turned to the concept of the mediatization of culture to address the various processes through which culture is influenced by the modus operandi of the media. On one hand, the media are cultural institutions and artifacts of their own, on the other hand, other domains have become dependent on the media and their various affordances.

Through religion
Media culture, in its mass marketing, has been compared to the role of religions in the past. It has been considered as taking the place of the old traditional religions. The waves of enthusiasm and fervent exaltation for a given product, a characteristic consumerist phenomenon, has been compared to the "ecstasies of the convulsions and miracles of the old religious fetishism".

Conversely, the Catholic Church, the dominant religious institution in the Western world, has been considered retrospectively as an antecedent and sophisticated form of public relations, advertiser and multinational corporation, selling its product to a mass of worshipers, frequently alternating as consumers.

Symbolic consumption
Consumers' decisions are made based not only on the economic concept of the utility material goods provide but also from their symbolic value in terms of the search for one's self and place within the context of society and group identity. In other words, the products consumers purchase are part of creating a story about who they are and whom they identify with.

Scholars view symbolic consumption as a social construct. A product is effective as an expression of identity only if the group shares a perception about the symbolic meaning of a product. These meanings are conveyed to consumers through advertising, magazines and television.

Jean Paul Sartre wrote that under certain conditions things, or even people, can become part of an extended concept of "self". Consumers may develop a narrative of their life based on their consumption choices to hold on to or break continuity with their past, understand themselves and express changes in their sense of self. The creation of a "lifestyle" association through consumption may mean avoiding past patterns of consumption that symbolize the old self or certain social groups. The symbolism of goods is based on socially shared beliefs.

Feminist approaches to media culture 
The feminist approaches related to media culture is something that can stem from feminist theory in relation to media culture. With the term feminism in itself having such a broad term, the feminist communication theory is something that branches off into many other concepts, thus providing us with feminist approaches on media culture. These approaches will often highlight how media has impacted women, the roles of women in media environments, how to dismantle certain perspectives with media culture etc..

For example, Angela McRobbie's analysis of teenage girls based on a popular magazine at the time called 'Jackie'. McRobbie uses a 'structural feminism' approach in order to analyze "the ideology of femininity in magazines and other medias, as identified through codes of romance, personal/domestic life, fashion/beauty, pop music and new sexualities." (Laughey, 2007). These codes had shown how these different aspects, when presented in the form of the popular media of the magazine 'Jackie', significantly impacted these individuals. The codes and case study showed how these aspects affected the way the teenage girls at this time acted, thought and portrayed themselves. Through approaches like McRobbie's it is shown how media culture had significant impact on women at this time. McRobbie's more recent research continuous to show how this is a prevalent reoccurrence in media culture and women.

Feminist approaches can also be applied when discussing media culture in terms of fashion, and how it can relate to other media's like music, magazines, celebrities etc.. An example of this, is looking at the postfeminism approach and how it is explained by certain researchers, that women and many young girls become victim to postfeminist styled fashion. Meaning, a style of fashion that is promoting the early and/or over sexualization of clothing to girls at a young age solely because of how they are marketed with the ideologies that come with a postfeminist approach. This particular concept, is not to disregard the meaning that postfeminism approach provides for society and women, but to see how a specific way of feminist thinking has affected women and media culture.

There are many feminist approaches to discuss, as well as different ways for researchers and individuals to apply these approaches to media culture. It is important to remember that feminist approaches are not the only way to understand media culture or dissect media culture, but one of many ways to do so.

See also

 Advanced capitalism
 Agenda-setting theory
 Consumer capitalism
 Consumtariat (Consumer-Proletariat)
 Culture industry
 Infotainment
 Low culture
 Mass communication
 Mass or crowd psychology
 Media studies
 Mediatization
 More popular than Jesus
 Propaganda
 The Society of the Spectacle
 Dumbing down

Notes

References
Adorno (1963) Culture Industry Reconsidered
Bignell, Jonathan (2007) Postmodern Media Culture
Debord (1977) [1967] The Society of the Spectacle, translation by Fredy Perlman and Jon Supak (Black & Red, 1970; rev. ed. 1977). Online at Library.nothingness.org (accessdate=2011-08-20)
Debord (1994) [1967] The Society of the Spectacle, translation by Donald Nicholson-Smith (New York: Zone Books). Online at Cddc.vt.edu (accessdate=2011-08-20)
Jansson, André (2002) The Mediatization of Consumption, Journal of Consumer Culture, March 2002 vol. 2 no. 1 5-31
Nomai, Afsheen Joseph (2008) Culture Jamming: Ideological Struggle and the Possibilities for Social Change. Free pdf download available.
Thoman, Elizabeth (1992) Rise of the Image Culture,  in Media & Values, Issue# 57
Thomas, P. L. (2012) Ignoring Poverty in the U.S. the Corporate Takeover of Public Education

Further reading
Duncan, Barry (1988). Mass Media and Popular Culture. Toronto, Ont.: Harcourt, Brace & Co. Canada. 

Media studies
Popular culture
Influence of mass media
Social influence